Veja may refer to :

Places
 Veja, a town in Lazio, central Italy; now Vejano comune
 Veja, a village in Stănița Commune, Neamț County, Romania
 Veja River, Romania
 Veja State, a former princely state in present Gujarat, western India

Persons
 Benita Vēja (born 1948), Latvian chess player

Other
 Veja Diena, a Latvian festival
 Veja (magazine), a Brazilian weekly newsmagazine
 Veja Sneakers, a brand of fair trade sneakers